Huxley is a city in Shelby County, Texas, United States. The population was 385 at the 2010 census.

Geography

Huxley is located at  (31.761773, –93.887578).

According to the United States Census Bureau, the city has a total area of 2.0 square miles (5.3 km2), of which, 2.0 square miles (5.2 km2) of it is land and 0.04 square miles (0.1 km2) of it (1.96%) is water.

Demographics

As of the census of 2000, there were 298 people, 135 households, and 103 families residing in the city. The population density was 148.8 people per square mile (57.5/km2). There were 230 housing units at an average density of 114.8/sq mi (44.4/km2). The racial makeup of the city was 98.32% White, 1.34% African American and 0.34% Native American. Hispanic or Latino of any race were 0.67% of the population.

There were 135 households, out of which 17.0% had children under the age of 18 living with them, 70.4% were married couples living together, 3.7% had a female householder with no husband present, and 23.0% were non-families. 20.0% of all households were made up of individuals, and 10.4% had someone living alone who was 65 years of age or older. The average household size was 2.21 and the average family size was 2.50.

In the city, the population was spread out, with 13.1% under the age of 18, 3.7% from 18 to 24, 18.1% from 25 to 44, 33.2% from 45 to 64, and 31.9% who were 65 years of age or older. The median age was 56 years. For every 100 females, there were 106.9 males. For every 100 females age 18 and over, there were 97.7 males.

The median income for a household in the city was $32,143, and the median income for a family was $40,000. Males had a median income of $41,875 versus $20,625 for females. The per capita income for the city was $19,504. About 7.5% of families and 9.6% of the population were below the poverty line, including 24.4% of those under the age of eighteen and 4.6% of those 65 or over.

Education
Public education in the city of Huxley is provided by the Shelbyville and Joaquin Independent School Districts.

References

Cities in Texas
Cities in Shelby County, Texas